Nicholas Cuccia (pronounced coo-cha; January 10, 1912 – January 29, 1994), better known by his stage name Nick Cravat, was an American actor and stunt performer.

Early life 
Nicholas Cuccia was born in Manhattan, New York City. His real surname was Italian and considered too hard to pronounce, so he took a stage name, Cravat, from a character in a play he had seen and liked.

Career 
Cravat and Burt Lancaster met as youngsters at a summer camp in New York and became lifelong friends. They created an acrobatic act called Lang and Cravat in the early 1930s, and joined the Kay Brothers circus in Florida. The pair worked at various circuses and in vaudeville. In 1939, Lancaster suffered a hand injury that ended their act. They would later reunite. He co-starred with Lancaster in nine films, including The Flame and the Arrow (1950), The Crimson Pirate (1952), Run Silent, Run Deep (1958), The Scalphunters (1968) and The Island of Dr. Moreau (1977). He played a mute character in several films such as The Flame and the Arrow, The Crimson Pirate, Davy Crockett, King of the Wild Frontier (1955), and the TV series The Count of Monte Cristo, mostly because his thick Brooklyn accent would have been out of place. He also played the "gremlin" on the wing of an airplane in the 1963 Twilight Zone episode "Nightmare at 20,000 Feet".

Personal life 
Cravat's first wife was Mae Ruth Cuccia, also known as Arlene Cravat. He had two daughters from his second  marriage, to Cecilia Brink: Marcelina "Marcy" Cravat-Overway and Christina "Tina" Cravat (a.k.a. Tina Cuccia).

Marcy Cravat is an environmental documentary filmmaker. Her debut film, Angel Azul, completed in 2014, won 12 awards. The film explores issues related to coral reefs through art activism. Dirt Rich, her second film, explores solutions to reverse the effects of global warming by re-stabilizing safe atmospheric carbon levels by returning carbon to the soil.

Death 
Cravat died of lung cancer in Woodland Hills, California, on January 29, 1994, at the age of 82. He is interred at North Hollywood's Valhalla Memorial Park Cemetery.

Filmography 

My Friend Irma (1949) – Mushie (uncredited)
The File on Thelma Jordon (1950) – Reporter (uncredited)
The Flame and the Arrow (1950) – Piccolo
Ten Tall Men (1951) – Disgruntled Riff (uncredited)
The Crimson Pirate (1952) – Ojo
The Veils of Bagdad (1953) – Ahmed
King Richard and the Crusaders (1954) – Nectobanus
3 Ring Circus (1954) – Timmy
Davy Crockett, King of the Wild Frontier (1955) – Busted Luck
The Big Knife (1955) – Nick (uncredited)
The Story of Mankind (1957) – Devil's Apprentice
Run Silent, Run Deep (1958) – Russo
Cat Ballou (1965) – Minor Role (uncredited)
The Way West (1967) – Calvelli
The Scalphunters (1968) – Yancy
Airport (1970) – Nick Valli – Passenger (uncredited)
Valdez Is Coming (1971) – Gang Member (uncredited)
Ulzana's Raid (1972) – Trooper
The Midnight Man (1974) – Gardener
The Island of Dr. Moreau (1977) – M'Ling (final film role)

References

External links 
 
 

American male film actors
American male television actors
1912 births
1994 deaths
Deaths from lung cancer in California
Burials at Valhalla Memorial Park Cemetery
20th-century American male actors
American stunt performers
Federal Theatre Project people